Two ships of the Royal Navy have borne the name Anne Gallant:

  was a ship built in 1512 and wrecked in 1518.
  was a 50-gun galley last listed in 1559.

See also
 

Royal Navy ship names

fi:HMS Anne Gallant